Angeloni is an Italian surname. Notable people with the surname include:

Adriano Angeloni (born 1983), Italian cyclist
Francesco Angeloni (died 1652), Italian writer, antiquarian and historian
Juan Angeloni (born 1978), Argentine sport shooter
Luciano Angeloni (1917–1996), Italian prelate of the Catholic Church
Michela Angeloni (born 1984), Italian ice hockey player

Italian-language surnames